The creamy-bellied gnatcatcher (Polioptila lactea) is a species of bird in the family Polioptilidae. It is found in Argentina, Brazil, and Paraguay.

Taxonomy and systematics

The creamy-bellied gnatcatcher is monotypic. It has occasionally been thought to be conspecific with the tropical gnatcatcher (P. plumbea).

Description

The male has a bluish-black cap and white lores and supercilium. Its upperparts are dark slate blue. Its long tail's central feathers are black and the outermost white with those between being black and white. Its cheeks and underparts are pale yellowish transitioning to white on the lower belly. The female and juvenile are similar to the male but with slate gray crowns.

Distribution and habitat

The creamy-bellied gnatcatcher is found in southern Brazil from Mato Grosso do Sul and Rio de Janeiro states south to Santa Catarina state and adjoining southeastern Paraguay and northeastern Argentina. It inhabits several biomes including open humid forest and its edges, temperate rainforest, semi-deciduous forest, and scrublands. It elevation it usually occurs below .

Behavior

Feeding

The creamy-bellied gnatcatcher's diet is not well known but is probably small insects and spiders. It forages by gleaning and hover-gleaning foliage, alone and in mixed-species foraging flocks.

Breeding

Almost nothing is known about the creamy-bellied gnatcatcher's breeding phenology. One nest has been described.

Vocalization

The creamy-bellied gnatcatcher's song is "a simple, rather fast repetition...tee tee tee tee swee swee swee" . Its call is spie .

Status

The IUCN has assessed the creamy-bellied gnatcatcher as Near Threatened. "This species is restricted to lowland forest in a region where habitat destruction has been widespread...and existing populations are likely to be highly fragmented."

References

creamy-bellied gnatcatcher
Birds of the Atlantic Forest
creamy-bellied gnatcatcher
Taxonomy articles created by Polbot